Gordon Charles "Don" Ladner (1948 – 26 January 2009) was a New Zealand rugby league player who represented New Zealand.

Playing career
Ladner worked in mines rescue in Reefton.

A West Coast representative, Ladner played 8 tests for the Kiwis from 1969 to 1970, scoring 76 points, all from goal kicking. He played three matches at the 1970 World Cup.

He died in Reefton on 26 January 2009 after suffering a heart attack. He was 60.

References

1948 births
2009 deaths
New Zealand national rugby league team players
New Zealand rugby league players
Rugby league fullbacks
West Coast rugby league team players
New Zealand miners
People from Reefton
Rugby league players from West Coast, New Zealand